David Henry Bartleet (11 April 1929 – 1 November 2002) was a British Anglican bishop. From 1982 to 1993, he was the fourth Bishop of Tonbridge, a suffragan bishop in the Diocese of Rochester.

He was educated at St Edward's School, Oxford and St Peter's Hall. Ordained in 1957 after a period of study at Westcott House, Cambridge, he began his ordained ministry with a curacy at St Mary-le-Tower, Ipswich. From here he became the vicar of Edenbridge and then Bromley before being ordained to the episcopate in 1982, serving eventually for 11 years. He died on 1 November 2002.

Notes

 

1929 births
Alumni of St Peter's College, Oxford
Bishops of Tonbridge
20th-century Church of England bishops
People educated at St Edward's School, Oxford
2002 deaths
Alumni of Westcott House, Cambridge